Caspar Kittel (1603 in Lauenstein–October 9, 1639 in Dresden) was a German Baroque theorbist and composer at the Dresden Hofkapelle. He was a pupil, then colleague of Heinrich Schütz, and preceded Schütz on the Kapellmeister's second sojourn in Italy from 1624. His brother was Christoph Kittel. His music was heavily influenced by the poetry of Martin Opitz.

Works, editions and recordings
Arien und Kantaten, Dresden, 1648

References

1603 births
1639 deaths
17th-century classical composers
German Baroque composers
German classical composers
German male classical composers
Theorbists
Pupils of Heinrich Schütz
17th-century male musicians